Arekurahatti is a village in Dharwad district of Karnataka, India.

Demographics
As of the 2011 Census of India there were 666 households in Arekurahatti and a total population of 3,387 consisting of 1,687 males and 1,700 females. There were 373 children ages 0-6.

References

Villages in Dharwad district